Zone three 6 is a Ghanaian 24-hour music channel from Zone Three 6 Network Limited. They are focused on curating music and engaging youth in social conversation. They are a multi-genre, multi-platform network that offers breaking music news, videos, artist interviews, exclusive performances, and original programming on Ghanaian Digital platforms.

History
Zone three 6 aired its first episode on 13 October 2013 on GHOne TV, as a 36 minutes edutainment television show.

They champion the youth, nurture their creativity and stand up for the issues they believe in by using the music they youth produces.

Zone Three 6 has represented Ghana on a couple of platforms like Channel O Music Video Awards 2014, MTV Africa Music Awards 15 & 16, IARA 2017, One Africa Music Festival 2017 and 18 in the United Kingdom, New York and Dubai.

In June 2021, Zone three 6 started airing as a free to air satelitte channel which is available to users in Ghana, parts of West Africa, Asia and the Middle East.

AWARDS
BEST CAMPUS TV SHOW in 2015

References

External links 
 

Ghanaian culture
Broadcasting in Ghana
Television channels and stations established in 1997
Television stations in Ghana
Mass media in Accra